Paul Jacques Marie Desfarges (born 7 May 1944) is a retired French-Algerian Jesuit priest who served as the Archbishop of Algiers from 2016 to 2021.

Career

Desfarges arrived in Algeria in 1965 for military service. He taught as a civilian in a White Fathers school in Ghardaia.

Returning to France, he decided to become a Jesuit and joined the novitiate on 14 October 1967. After his vows as religious, and theological studies, he was ordained a priest on 14 June 1975. He made his solemn profession on 30 April 1981.

Desfarges then spent nearly 30 years in Constantine, where, among other subjects, he taught psychology at the university from 1976 to 2006. In 1982, he obtained Algerian citizenship.
 
Beginning in 2006, he headed the spiritual center Ben Smen to Algiers, while the upper Algiers Jesuit community.

Pope Benedict XVI appointed him Bishop of Constantine and Hippo on 21 November 2008. He succeeded Bishop Gabriel Piroird, who retired for reasons of age. Desfarges was consecrated on 12 February 2009 and installed as the bishop of Constantine eight days later.

On 24 December 2016 Pope Francis named Desfarges the Archbishop of Algiers. He submitted his resignation when he reached the mandatory retirement age of 75 and his resignation was accepted by Francis 27 December 2021.

References

External links

 http://www.catholic-hierarchy.org/bishop/bdesfar.html

French Roman Catholic archbishops
1944 births
Living people
French Jesuits
Jesuit archbishops
Roman Catholic bishops of Constantine
French expatriate bishops
Roman Catholic archbishops of Algiers
21st-century Algerian people